Philip Kevin Paul is a Canadian poet.

His debut collection Taking the Names Down from the Hill won the Dorothy Livesay Poetry Prize in 2004, and his second collection Little Hunger was a shortlisted nominee for the 2009 ReLit Award for poetry and the Governor General's Award for English-language poetry at the 2009 Governor General's Awards.

A former competitive boxer, he is a member of the Saanich First Nation on Vancouver Island. He is a graduate of the University of Victoria. In 2019, Paul co-taught a writing course at the University of Victoria called A Sense of Place.

References

Living people
21st-century Canadian poets
Writers from British Columbia
University of Victoria alumni
Canadian male poets
First Nations poets
21st-century Canadian male writers
21st-century First Nations writers
Year of birth missing (living people)